The L & N Marine Terminal Building is a historic site in Pensacola, Florida. It is located at Commendencia Street Wharf. On August 14, 1972, it was added to the U.S. National Register of Historic Places.

In 1989, the building was listed in A Guide to Florida's Historic Architecture, published by the University of Florida Press.

References

External links
 current photo
 detailed construction and historical data from the Library of Congress
 Escambia County listings at National Register of Historic Places
 Florida's Office of Cultural and Historical Programs
 Escambia County listings

Buildings and structures in Pensacola, Florida
National Register of Historic Places in Escambia County, Florida